Azerbaijanis in Uzbekistan are part of the Azerbaijani diaspora. They are Uzbek citizens and permanent residents of ethnic Azerbaijani background. Azerbaijan and Uzbekistan used to be part of the Russian Empire and later the Soviet Union. Currently there are over 35,848 Azerbaijanis in Uzbekistan, making up 0.15% of Uzbekistan's population.

Notable people 
 Movlud Miraliyev
 Rafig Huseynov

See also  
 Azerbaijan–Uzbekistan relations
 Turkic Council
 Demographics of Uzbekistan

External links 
Soviet Census 1970: Uzbekistan
Soviet Census 1979: Uzbekistan
Soviet Census 1989: Uzbekistan

References 

Ethnic groups in Uzbekistan
Azerbaijani diaspora
Azerbaijani emigrants to Uzbekistan